5β-Dihydrocortisone is an endogenous steroid formed from cortisone by 5β-reductase.

References

Diols
Pregnanes
Triketones